MERCAZ Olami is a Zionist political organization representing the world Masorti/Conservative Movement of Judaism in the World Zionist Organization, Jewish Agency for Israel, Keren Kayemeth Leyisrael and Keren HaYesod.. 'Mercaz' is the Hebrew word for 'center', whilst 'olami' means 'worldwide' or 'global'. 

Within the organizations in which it operates, the MERCAZ movement advocates for full equality for Masorti/Conservative Judaism in Israel.

Leadership
The current President of MERCAZ is Alan Silverstein, a Masorti/Conservative Rabbi, and member of Congregation Agudath Israel in New Jersey. He succeeded Stephen Wolnek in 2016.

The current Executive Director is Mauricio Balter, the executive director of Masorti Olami. Prior to this, it was Rabbi Tzvi Graetz.

Results at the World Zionist Congress

38th World Zionist Congress (2020) 
The 38th World Zionist Congress took place virtually due to COVID-19 restrictions, from October 20–22, 2020. There were 15 slates with 1,800 delegate candidates, competing for 152 seats that are elected by Americans. Mercaz USA won 18 seats out of the 152. Further to this, MERCAZ received another 19 mandates from the Diaspora, making MERCAZ the fourth largest faction at the Congress.

Viewpoints
The Masorti movement (through MERCAZ Olami) condemned a plan by the Jewish National Fund to purchase private land in Area C of the West Bank, calling it "damaging to the legitimacy of Israel and favoring the settlement policy of the extreme right in Israel". They stated that the move to buy private Palestinian land "could irreversibly endanger KKL and our homeland". Similarly, the organization denounces West Bank settlements and opposes plans to buy private Arab-owned lands in the areas of Judea and Samaria.

MERCAZ Olami also pushes for no restrictions of the Law of Return (the law regarding Jewish immigration to Israel) as well as increased funding for its programs. Important also to the slate is the implementation of the egalitarian prayer plan at the Western Wall, creating a place for non-Orthodox prayer, and an open Jewish 'pluralistic society'. MERCAZ also pushes for recognition of all conversions and weddings performed by Masorti/Conservative rabbis as well as state funding for their rabbis.

References 

Zionist organizations
Jewish organizations based in Israel
Organizations based in Jerusalem
Organizations with year of establishment missing
International organizations based in Israel